Sandrine Claire Holt (born Sandrine Vanessa Ho; 19 November 1972) is a British-born Canadian model and actress.

Early life
Holt was born Sandrine Vanessa Ho in Croydon. Her middle name was later changed to Claire. Her father, Man Shun ("Horace") Ho, is Chinese. Ho was educated at the University of London, receiving a (B.Sc Physics and Applied Mathematics; M.Sc Computer Science). Her mother, Christiane (née Nicolette), is French. At age five, she and her family moved to Toronto, Canada. Holt attended St. Joseph's Morrow Park Catholic Secondary School in Willowdale. She worked as a runway model in Paris before she became an actress. Her younger sister is model and designer Adrianne Ho.

Acting career
Holt's acting debut, credited as Sandrine Ho, was in a 1989 episode of Friday the 13th: The Series entitled  "Face of Evil". Her feature film debut was in Black Robe in 1991. Subsequent film and television appearances include roles in Rapa-Nui, Once a Thief, Pocahontas: The Legend and Resident Evil: Apocalypse.

In 2004, she appeared in Resident Evil: Apocalypse in a minor role as a anchorwoman named Terri Morales. Then again in 2006, she appeared in a recurring role on the television series 24 as Evelyn Martin, the aide to First Lady Martha Logan. In 2007 she appeared in the recurring role of Catherine Rothberg in Showtime's series The L Word.

In 2012, she appeared in Underworld: Awakening as Lida, an Antigen employee who took care of the protagonist's daughter, a prisoner named Subject Two.

In 2013 she appeared in the first season of House of Cards as Gillian Cole, the leader of a grass-roots organization called World Well that provides clean water to developing countries.

In 2015, she appeared in the film Terminator Genisys, and the TV series Fear the Walking Dead.

In 2016, she appeared in  MacGyver as Patricia Thornton, an ex-field agent turned director of operations for DXS.

In 2018, she had a recurring role on Law & Order: Special Victims Unit as Dr. Lisa Abernathy, a clinical psychologist who assesses defendants before their trials.

In December 2022, Holt was cast in an undisclosed major role in Daredevil: Born Again.  In March 2023, it was revealed that Holt will portray Vanessa Fisk.

Personal life
Holt was married to rock producer/engineer Travis Huff, but later divorced.

In 2015, she posed nude for the May issue of Allure magazine.

Filmography

Film

Television

Awards and nominations

References

External links 
 Biographie de Sandrine Holt en français avec des extraits vidéo
 
 An Interview with Sandrine Holt at Asiance Magazine, September 2006

1972 births
20th-century Canadian actresses
21st-century Canadian actresses
Actresses from London
Actresses from Toronto
Canadian actresses of Hong Kong descent
Canadian expatriate actresses in the United States
Female models from Ontario
Canadian film actresses
Canadian people of French descent
Canadian television actresses
Living people
People from Croydon
20th-century English women
20th-century English people
21st-century English women
21st-century English people